Allan Sinclair is a former Australian rules footballer who played with Fitzroy and Saint Kilda in the Victorian Football League (VFL) and Port Melbourne in the Victorian Football Association (VFA). His son Callum currently plays for Sydney Swans.

References

External links 		

1953 births
St Kilda Football Club players
Fitzroy Football Club players
Port Melbourne Football Club players
Australian rules footballers from Victoria (Australia)
Living people